Ville Laine (born February 25, 1989) is a Finnish professional ice hockey player who played with Ilves in the SM-liiga during the 2010-11 season.

References

External links

1989 births
Finnish ice hockey defencemen
Ilves players
Living people
Ice hockey people from Tampere